Roman Květ (born 17 December 1997) is a Czech professional footballer who plays as a midfielder for Viktoria Plzeň. He had made eight appearances for 1. FK Příbram, totaling just over six-hundred minutes, and accumulating three red cards, before he moved to Bohemians in July 2020 after going on loan with them the previous season.

References 

1997 births
Living people
1. FK Příbram players
Association football midfielders
Czech footballers
Bohemians 1905 players
Czech Republic youth international footballers
Czech Republic under-21 international footballers
FC Viktoria Plzeň players